Okpoko is a town in Anambra State, Nigeria.  It sits on the east bank of the Niger River just north of the larger city of Onitsha.  As of 2007 Okpoko had an estimated population of 177,608.

References

Populated places in Anambra State